The 2021 Big Ten women's basketball tournament was a postseason tournament held from March 9–13, 2021 at Bankers Life Fieldhouse in Indianapolis. The winner of this tournament, Maryland earned an automatic bid to the 2021 NCAA Division I women's basketball tournament.

Seeds
Only 13 out of the 14 Big Ten schools participated in the tournament. Ohio State did not compete this year due to a self-imposed postseason ban. Teams were seeded by 2020–21 Big Ten Conference season record. The top 11 teams received a first-round bye and the top four teams received a double bye.

Schedule

Bracket
 All times are Eastern.

* denotes overtime period

References

Big Ten women's basketball tournament
Tournament
Big Ten women's basketball tournament
Big Ten women's basketball tournament
Big Ten Men's Tournament, 2008
College basketball tournaments in Indiana